Fleet is a surname. Notable people with the surname include:

Charles Browne Fleet (1843-1916), American pharmacist
David Fleet (born 1954), Canadian politician
Frank Fleet (1848-1900), American baseball player
Frederick Fleet (1887-1965), British sailor and Titanic survivor
Greg Fleet (born 1960), Australian comedian
James Fleet (born 1954), British actor
John Faithfull Fleet (1847–1917), historian, epigraphist and linguist
John Fleet (Lord Mayor) (1648–1712), Member of Parliament and Sheriff for London
John Fleet (MP), Member of Parliament for Weymouth and Melcombe Regis (UK Parliament constituency) in 1397
Larry Fleet, American singer
Pat Fleet (born 1943), American voice actress
Preston Fleet (1934-1995), American businessman
Reuben H. Fleet (1887-1975), American aviation pioneer
Stephen Fleet (1936-2006), British administrator

See also
Stephan Szpak-Fleet (born 1979), Polish-born American actor
Van Fleet, a list of people with the surname

Toponymic surnames